Joachim Wenzke (born 20 April 1941) is an East German sprint canoer who competed in the late 1960s. He finished sixth in the K-4 1000 m event at the 1968 Summer Olympics in Mexico City.

References
Sports-reference.com profile

1941 births
Canoeists at the 1968 Summer Olympics
German male canoeists
Living people
Olympic canoeists of East Germany
Place of birth missing (living people)